Omagua or low jungle (selva baja or partially tierra caliente) is one of the eight natural regions of Peru. It is located between 80 and 400m above sea level in the Peruvian Amazonia (Amazon rainforest). In this region, there are a lot of rivers that create meanders, swamps and lagoons.

The flora includes trees like cedro and palms (e.g. genus Phytelephas, tucumo (Astrocaryum aculeatum), shapaja (Attalea phalerata) and shebo (Attalea butyracea)). There are also plants like the Cattleya rex, a species of orchid.

The fauna includes animals like the capybara (which is the biggest rodent in the world), the giant armadillo, the jaguar, the giant otter, and the red brocket deer. There are also numerous species of birds, including the white-throated toucan, the hoatzin, the jabiru, and the red-and-green macaw. Animals that live in the water include the paiche, the Amazonian manatee and pipa toads.

Overview

Andean Continental Divide

Mountain top 
 Mountain passes - 4,100 m   
 Puna grassland  
 Andean-alpine desert
 Snow line - about 5,000 m  
 Janca - rocks, snow and ice
 Peak

See also
 Climate zones by altitude
 Altitudinal zonation

Literature 

Physiographic regions of Peru